The following pendulum is known as the Mackerras pendulum, invented by psephologist Malcolm Mackerras. Designed for the outcome of the 2007 federal election, the pendulum works by lining up all of the seats held in Parliament, 83 Labor, 55 Liberal, 10 National, and 2 independent, according to the percentage point margin on a two candidate preferred basis, as elected in 2007. The two candidate result is also known as the swing required for the seat to change hands. Given a uniform swing to the opposition or government parties in an election, the number of seats that change hands can be predicted. Swing is never uniform, but in practice variations of swing among the Australian states usually tend to cancel each other out. Seats are arranged in safeness categories according to the Australian Electoral Commission's classification of safeness. "Safe" seats require a swing of over 10 per cent to change, "fairly safe" seats require a swing of between 6 and 10 per cent, while "marginal" seats require a swing of less than 6 per cent.

References

2007 elections in Australia
Pendulums for Australian federal elections